

Aces

References 

Victories, 11